The 1976 World Amateur Snooker Championship was the seventh edition of the tournament also known as the IBSF World Snooker Championship. The 1976 tournament was played in Johannesburg from 12 to 30 October 1976. Doug Mountjoy defeated Paul Mifsud 11–1 in the final to win the title.

Tournament summary
The first World Amateur Snooker Championship was held in 1963. The defending champion for 1976 was Ray Edmonds, who had won the tournament in 1972 and 1974. The 1976 tournament was held at the President Hotel, Johannesburg, South Africa, from 12 to 30 October 1976, with 24 participants playing in three eight-player round-robin groups followed by a knockout to determine the champion. Apartheid was in force in South Africa, and following the advice of their respective governments, players from India and Sri Lanka did not take part in the competition.

Doug Mountjoy was the only player to win all of his group matches. Edmonds lost the title when he was defeated 1–5 by Paul Mifsud in the quarter-finals. In another of the quarter-finals, Silvino Francisco eliminated his brother Manuel Francisco 5–1. The final was contested by Mountjoy and Mifsud, with Mountjoy taking a 6–0 lead by the end of the first  and completing an 11–1 victory in the second session on 29 October, meaning that the scheduled session for 30 October was not required.

Mountjoy compiled the highest  of the tournament, 107, during the group stage.

Qualifying groups
The final tables are shown below. Players in bold qualified for the next round.

Group A

Group B

Group C

Knockout
Players in bold denote match winners.

Final
Scores in bold indicate winning  scores.

References

Snooker amateur tournaments
International sports competitions hosted by South Africa
1976 in snooker
World Amateur Snooker Championship